Pilgrim Lutheran School, Chicago, is a Lutheran private school affiliated with Pilgrim Lutheran Church in Chicago, Illinois. Collectively, the church and school are referred to as Pilgrim Lutheran Church and School.

About the school 
Pilgrim Lutheran School is a private preschool and elementary school located at 4300 North Winchester on Chicago's North Side. Students begin at age three and continue through 8th grade.

The school was founded as a summer school in 1920. In 1921, it became a year-round school. Today, headed by Principal Chris Comella, Pilgrim's enrollment averages about 160 students.

The school is fully accredited by the Evangelical Lutheran Education Association and has earned recognition by the Illinois State Board of Education.

About the church 
Pilgrim Lutheran Church is a member of the Evangelical Lutheran Church in America.

School philosophy 
The stated philosophy of Pilgrim Lutheran School is:

Admissions policy
Pilgrim admits students of any race, color or national and ethnic origin.

Pilgrim Kids Care
Pilgrim Kids Care is a program at Pilgrim Lutheran School that teaches social responsibility through action. Students participate in year-round projects to unite the community in awareness of the prevalence of youth hunger and homelessness.

References

External links

 

Evangelical Lutheran Church in America schools
Private elementary schools in Chicago
Lutheran schools in Illinois
Private middle schools in Chicago